Sara Khatun was an influential woman of the Aq Qoyunlu state, as the political adviser of her son, Uzun Hasan (r. 1457–1478). She was a successful and well-respected diplomatic mediator.

Early life 
According to historian John E. Woods, Sara Khatun was the daughter of Pir Ali Bayandur, the ruler of Kiğı. Pir Ali was himself the son of the Aq Qoyunlu ruler Fakhr ad-Din Qutlu by his Pontic wife Maria Comnena, sister of Alexios III of Trebizond. German orientalist Franz Babinger speculates that Sara Khatun was an Aramaic Christian who grew up near Diyarbakir, but this speculation is based on an earlier assumption by Vladimir Minorsky which he later renounced. Sara Khatun married her paternal cousin Ali, the son of the leader of the Aq Qoyunlu federation Qara Osman. She widowed in 1444.

Political influence 
Sara Khatun came to have great political influence during the reign of her son. She was a skilful diplomat and headed embassies for the purpose of regulating disputed issues. Sara Khatun was well-known in the west, and foreign ambassadors frequently took advantage of her influence over her son. For example, in 1463 Josaphat Barbaro was sent from Venice to the court of Uzun Hasan with the instructions "Meet the ruler’s mother, assure her of respect and present gifts..." in order to persuade her to an "enterprise" beneficial to Venice (war with the Ottoman Empire).

She aided in the reconciliation of Uzun Hasan and her other son Jahangir, who had challenged Uzun-Hasan's rule. Sara Khatun was also sent to negotiate with the mother of Timurid ruler Abu Said, but her efforts were futile. She had also travelled to the Mamluk Sultanate, in an attempt to solve Jahangir's problems.

Negotiations with Mehmed II 
Sara Khatun's negotiations with the Ottoman sultan Mehmed II were particularly successful. Negotiations with Mehmed II took place in 1461, during Mehmed II's Anatolian campaign. The Ottoman army captured Sinop and headed towards Trebizond. Fearing that Mehmed was planning an attack on the Aq Qoyunlu, Uzun-Hasan sent his mother to negotiate, accompanied by many sheikhs and princes from the region and expensive gifts.

According to Ottoman historians Tursun Beg and Sadeddin Efendi, Sara Khatun met with the influential Grand Vizier Mahmud Pasha at night and begged him for assistance. Mahmud Pasha responded positively to her request and arranged for her to meet with Mehmed. According to historian Steven Runciman, Mehmed treated Sara Khatun well because his plans at the time were limited to capturing the Black Sea coast. As a result, Mahmud Pasha accepted the proposals of Sara Khatun for peace. During the negotiations, she referred to Mehmed as "my son", while he referred to her as "mother". Sara Khatun tried to persuade Mehmed to not capture Trebizond as it was the land of her daughter-in-law, Despina Khatun: "Why waste so much effort, my son, because of such nonsense as Trebizond?" she asked. Mehmed, on the other hand, was not inclined to deviate from his plans. As a result, Sara Khatun made an agreement with Uzun Hasan not to interfere with the Ottoman Turks' capture of Trebizond. Despite her gracious reception, Mehmed refused to let her return with his men and detained her until the end of the campaign. This was done to avoid any Aq Qoyunlu attacks during the conquest of Trebizond. Sara Khatun was given piles of jewellery captured by the Ottomans in Trebizond in exchange for her mediation.

Sara Khatun may have granted asylum to the last Emperor of Trebizond, David, and his family for a brief period after Trebizond's capture. Mehmed II promised Sara Khatun that he would not harm the emperor or his family. Mehmed partially fulfilled the promise except for the daughter of Emperor David, Anna, who was taken into Mehmed's harem, and later married to Zaganos Pasha. Except for Anna and his nephew Alexei, the former emperor and his children were graciously received by the Sultan and sent on a special ship to Constantinople with courtiers and personal property. Two years later, however, David was charged with treason and executed alongside his son. The reason for David's execution was his correspondence with his niece, Uzun-wife, Hasan's Despina-Khatun.

Family
By her husband, Sara Khatun had seven sons and a daughter: 
 Jahangir Mirza Beg
 Uzun Hasan Beg
 Hussein Beg
 Jahanshah Beg
 Iskander Beg
 Ibrahim Beg
 Uveysh Beg
 Khadija Beyim Khatun. She married Shaykh Junayd of Safavid dynasty between 1456 and 1459. Their son, Haydar Safavi, married his cousin Alamshah Halima Khatun, daughter of Uzun Hassan and Teodora Despina Khatun, and was father of Ismail I and grandfather of Tahmasp I.

References

Literature 
 
 
 
 
 
 
 
 
 
 
 
 
 
 

15th-century women
Year of death unknown
Year of birth unknown
People from the Aq Qoyunlu
1465 deaths